Cocorote is a city in and the seat of the Cocorote Municipality in the state of Yaracuy, Venezuela.

The patron of the city is Saint Jerome.

Baseball is a popular sport in Cocorote, and there is a stadium located in the city.

References

Cities in Yaracuy